The 2016 MAAC men's soccer tournament was the 24th edition of the MAAC Men's Soccer Tournament. The tournament decided the Metro Atlantic Athletic Conference champion and guaranteed representative into the 2016 NCAA Division I Men's Soccer Championship.

The defending champions, Rider Broncs successfully defended their title, beating regular season champions, Quinnipiac, 3–1 in the championship game. The title was Rider's fourth overall MAAC championship. Additionally, Rider became the first school since Marist in 2004–2005 to repeat as MAAC Tournament champions.  

Quinnipiac University hosted the semifinals and final of the tournament, while the first round was hosted by the higher seeds.

Seeds
Seeds for the tournament are determined by teams' conference records, with tiebreakers determined according to MAAC tiebreaker rules.

Bracket

Results

First round

Semifinals

Final

All-Tournament team 

The MAAC All-Tournament team was announced following the championship. The MVP is in bold text.

References

External links 
MAAC Tournament Home

2016 Metro Atlantic Athletic Conference men's soccer season
MAAC Men's Soccer Tournament